The Primetime Emmy Award for Outstanding Cinematography for a Series (Half-Hour) is an annual award presented as part of the Primetime Emmy Awards. It was created as Outstanding Cinematography for a Half-Hour Series, incorporating both single and multi-camera programs, in 2008 alongside Outstanding Cinematography for a One Hour Series. From 2011 to 2016, the awards were combined as Outstanding Cinematography for a Single-Camera Series. In 2023, the category will be renamed Outstanding Cinematography for a Series (Half-Hour), combining with Outstanding Cinematography for a Multi-Camera Series.

The categories were divided again in 2017. However, only single-camera series are eligible for the award with multi-camera half-hour series competing for Outstanding Cinematography for a Multi-Camera Series.

Winners and nominations
Outstanding Cinematography for a Half-Hour Series

2000s

2010s

Between 2011-2016, half-hour and one-hour series were both eligible for Outstanding Cinematography for a Single-Camera Series. No half-hour series were nominated during these years.

Outstanding Cinematography for a Single-Camera Series (Half-Hour)

2020s

Outstanding Cinematography for a Series (Half-Hour)

Programs with multiple wins
2 wins
 Atlanta
 Californication
 The Mandalorian

Programs with multiple nominations
Totals for Outstanding Cinematography for a Multi-Camera Series are excluded, as this category exclusively recognizes single-camera half-hour series since 2017.

5 nominations
 Insecure

3 nominations
 The Mandalorian 
 30 Rock

2 nominations
 Atlanta
 Ballers
 Barry
 Californication
 The End of the F***ing World
 Everybody Hates Chris
 Grown-ish
 Hacks
 Homecoming
 Mozart in the Jungle
 Russian Doll
 Weeds

Cinematographers with multiple wins
2 wins
 Christian Sprenger

Cinematographers with multiple nominations

4 nominations
 Mark Doering-Powell

3 nominations
 Ava Berkofsky
 Christian Sprenger 

2 nominations
 Adam Bricker
 Vanja Cernjul
 Matthew Clark
 Tobias Datum 
 Michael Trim

Notes

References

Cinematography for a Half-Hour Series
Awards for best cinematography